319 Dark Street is a webcomic written and drawn by David Wade. It began in June 2004 and concluded in 2015. The story follows Amanda "The bitch with a bob" Kayne, a former boxer who must deal with multiple attempts on her life. The webcomic is known for having a strong film noir ambiance and features multiple instances of dark humor.

Synopsis 
In 319 Dark Street, protagonist Amanda Kayne is being stalked by hitmen after refusing to take a loss in her last fight. As a further complication, she has to reside in a decrepit building in the fictional Michigan city of Middlebay as a condition for inheriting her uncle's fortune. Amanda spends her time fending off attackers while wise-cracking with her black cat and making a living singing in a jazz quartet. 319 Dark Street features a strong film noir ambiance and its characters make frequent use of dark humor.

Recognition 
In 2008, David Wade was a featured guest at I-CON and in 2010, 319 Dark Street was nominated for an award in the category "Outstanding Use Of Color" by the webcomic hosting website Comic Genesis.

Notes

External links 

2000s webcomics
2004 webcomic debuts
2015 webcomic endings